Churilovo is a rural locality (a village) in Tolpukhovskoye Rural Settlement, Sobinsky District, Vladimir Oblast, Russia. The population was 8 as of 2010.

Geography 
Churilovo is located on the Kolochka River, 28 km northeast of Sobinka (the district's administrative centre) by road. Krutoy Ovrag is the nearest rural locality.

References 

Rural localities in Sobinsky District